Ayad Al Adhamy is an American multi-instrumentalist, producer and record label owner based in Brooklyn New York. He is the former synthesizer, sample, and percussion player of Passion Pit, and shared remix duties with Nate Donmoyer and Ian Hultquist.

He currently fronts the Brooklyn garage rock outfit Team Spirit, signed to Vice Records/Warner Bros. Records. They released their Self Titled Debut EP on April 4, 2013, and it was received positively. (Rolling Stone) Coupled with the EP, is an ongoing extreme-animated series of music videos, created by Swedish animation duo HannesJohannes about "...the idea of Damnation and Salvation."

In 2010, Ayad Al Adhamy, started Black Bell Records, an independent record label  that released the debut EP of The Joy Formidable and singles by Dom, Girlfriends, Pretty & Nice and Reptar. Full Length releases include Secret Music, Stepdad and Guards.

Ayad Al Adhamy is an alumnus of the Berklee College of Music (2009). He is an official endorsed artist of Moog, Dave Smith and Korg instruments.

Team Spirit Releases

Black Bell Records Releases

Producer/Engineer/Mixer

Remixes as Passion Pit

Remixes as Bo Flex

Remixes as Team Spirit

References

External links
 Passion Pit Website
 Black Bell Records Website

1985 births
Living people
American multi-instrumentalists
Berklee College of Music alumni
Bahraini emigrants to the United States
People from Manama
Passion Pit members
American people of Bahraini descent